Carol Ruth Berkin (born October 1, 1942) is an American historian and author specializing in women's role in American colonial history.

Biography 
She was born in Mobile, Alabama. She is divorced with two children. She graduated from Barnard College in 1964 and holds a Ph.D. from Columbia University.

She taught at Baruch College from 1972 to 2008 and has taught at the Graduate Center of the City University of New York since 1983. She is currently Baruch Presidential Professor of History at the City University of New York.

She has worked as a historical commentator for several television documentaries, most notably PBS's Dolley Madison: America’s First Lady.

Awards 
Berkin has received the Bancroft Dissertation Award from the Bancroft Foundation. and a grant from the National Endowment for the Humanities.

Selected works 
 
 
 
 
 
 
  Wondrous Beauty was reviewed in the New York Times.
A Sovereign People: The Crises of the 1790s and the Birth of American Nationalism (2017)

References

External links
 
 
 IMDB.com entry
 

1942 births
American women historians
Barnard College alumni
Columbia University alumni
Writers from Mobile, Alabama
Living people
21st-century American historians
21st-century American women writers